The Church of the Immaculate Conception is a Roman Catholic church in Johor Bahru, Johor, Malaysia. It is the oldest church in Johor Bahru, built in 1927 by the late Rev. Fr. C. Saleilles, M. AP. The original church was built in 1883 and was dedicated to Our Lady of Lourdes. The church is an active centre of Catholic life and prayer in the heart of Johor Bahru City. The Roman Catholic priests continue their tradition of preaching, personal instruction, sacramental life and pastoral care extending well beyond the geographical boundaries of Johor Bahru.

History
The beginnings saw the establishment of Johor as an outstation of Serangoon in 1881. Rev. Fr. Saleilles came to administer to the needs of the Catholic families by boat. He was generous to the poor.

Some time later, a piece of land was given by His Highness Sultan Abu Bakar and in 1883, the little church of Our Lady of Lourdes was inaugurated. This building (see picture 1 above) was later used as a funeral parlour.

The present Church of the Immaculate Conception was built by Rev. Fr. M Duvelle, and blessed by Bishop Barillon at the end of 1921, when there was only a wooden bridge linking Johor and Singapore.

The late Sultan Ibrahim also donated the big statue of Our Lady to the church. It now stands in front of the Church. It was blessed on 8 September 1947 by Rev. Fr. Noel Goh.

See also
Religion in Malaysia

External links

Official Website

Buildings and structures in Johor Bahru
Churches in Johor